George William Norman Cockburn (February 14, 1931 – August 2, 1997) was a Canadian politician. He served in the Legislative Assembly of New Brunswick from 1967 to 1982 as member of the Progressive Conservative party from the constituency of Charlotte from 1967 to 1974 and St. Stephen-Milltown from 1974 to 1982.

References

1931 births
1997 deaths
Progressive Conservative Party of New Brunswick MLAs
20th-century Canadian politicians
Members of the Legislative Assembly of New Brunswick